Love Hurts is a 2009 romantic comedy film with Richard E. Grant, Carrie-Anne Moss, Johnny Pacar, Jenna Elfman, Janeane Garofalo and Camryn Manheim. It was written and directed by Barra Grant.

On review aggregator Rotten Tomatoes, the film holds an approval rating of 29% based on 7 reviews, with an average rating of 4.14/10.

Synopsis
Richard E. Grant plays Ben Bingham, a middle-aged ear, nose and throat doctor. Carrie-Anne Moss plays Amanda, his vibrant wife. Amanda leaves Ben when the idea of sharing an empty nest with her inattentive husband becomes unbearable. Ben becomes depressed and tries to drown himself in alcohol. He walks around in  pajamas until his son Justin (Johnny Pacar) gives his dad a makeover and introduces him to the social scene. Before long, Ben becomes so popular that he is pursued by his nurse, his personal trainer, and karaoke-loving twin sisters. However, things quickly change when Justin finds himself in love. It is now Ben’s turn to teach his son the art of romance and in the process recapture his own wife's love.

Cast
 Richard E. Grant as Ben Bingham
 Carrie-Anne Moss as Amanda Bingham
 Johnny Pacar as Justin Bingham
 Jenna Elfman as Darlene
 Janeane Garofalo as Hannah Rosenbloom
 Camryn Manheim as Gloria
 Julia Voth as Young Amanda
 Angela Sarafyan as Layla
 Jeffrey Nordling as Curtis
 Yvonne Zima as Andrea
 Olga Fonda as Valeriya
 Rita Rudner as Lisa Levanthorp
 Jim Turner as Doctor
 Cameron Van Hoy as Young Ben
 Candice Accola as Sharon

References

External links 
 
 
 Love Hurts at the Cleveland International Film Festival
 
 Love Hurts at Metacritic
 
 

2009 films
American romantic comedy films
2009 romantic comedy films
Films directed by Barra Grant
Films with screenplays by Barra Grant
2000s English-language films
2000s American films

es:Love Hurts#Cine